Uros Vico (born 19 February 1981) is a Croatian-born Italian retired tennis player.

Vico had a career high ATP Tour singles ranking of World No.166, achieved on 26 July 2004. He also had a career high ATP Tour doubles ranking of World No. 80, achieved on 8 August 2005.

Vico reached 14 career singles finals with a record of 7 wins and 7 losses, which includes a 2–1 record in ATP Challenger Tour finals. Additionally, he reached 32 career doubles finals with a record of 15 wins and 17 losses, including having an 8–10 record in ATP Challenger Tour finals. In 2004, he would reach his sole final on the ATP Tour, in doubles at the 2004 Open de Moselle on hard courts in Metz, France. Partnered with Ivan Ljubičić they managed to reach the final where they were defeated by French pairing Arnaud Clément and Nicolas Mahut in straight sets 2–6, 6–7(8–10).

Vico retired from professional tennis and became the coach of Italian tennis player Marco Cecchinato who defeated Novak Djokovic at the 2018 French Open Quarterfinals.

ATP Career Finals

Doubles: 1 (1 runner-up)

ATP Challenger and ITF Futures finals

Singles: 14 (7–7)

Doubles: 31 (15–16)

Performance timeline

Singles

See also
 Croats of Italy

References

External links
 
 

1981 births
Living people
Croatian emigrants to Italy
Italian male tennis players
Tennis players from Rome
Tennis players from Split, Croatia
People with acquired Italian citizenship